Jordan Lotiès (born 5 August 1984) is a French professional footballer who plays as a central defender.

Club career
Born in Clermont-Ferrand, Lotiès began his senior career with hometown's Clermont Foot, playing three full seasons with the side in Ligue 2. After the club's relegation he joined fellow second-divisioner Dijon FCO.

On 4 June 2009 Lotiès moved to Ligue 1 side AS Nancy. He made his top flight debut on 8 August, starting in a 3–1 success at Valenciennes FC; and scored his first goal for Nancy on 8 December 2012, in a 1–1 home draw against Valenciennes.

On 18 June 2013, free agent Lotiès signed a three-year deal with La Liga strugglers CA Osasuna. He made his debut abroad on 18 August, in a 1–2 home loss against Granada CF.

On 22 January 2016, after being rarely used, Lotiès rescinded his contract with the Navarrese outfit.

Personal life
Lotiès is or Martiniquais descent.

References

External links
Nancy official profile 
Foot-National profile 

Living people
1984 births
Sportspeople from Clermont-Ferrand
French footballers
French people of Martiniquais descent
Association football defenders
Ligue 1 players
Ligue 2 players
Clermont Foot players
Dijon FCO players
AS Nancy Lorraine players
CA Osasuna players
K.A.S. Eupen players
La Liga players
Segunda División players
French expatriate footballers
French expatriate sportspeople in Spain
Expatriate footballers in Spain
Belgian Pro League players
Footballers from Auvergne-Rhône-Alpes